
Year 886 (DCCCLXXXVI) was a common year starting on Saturday of the Julian calendar.

Events 
 By place 
 Byzantine Empire 
 March – A wide-ranging conspiracy against Emperor Basil I, led by John Kourkouas, is uncovered.
 August 29 – Emperor Basil I the Macedonian dies from a fever, contracted after a hunting accident. He is succeeded by the 19-year-old Leo VI, a son of former emperor Michael III, as sole ruler (basileus) of the Byzantine Empire. After his coronation Leo reburies the remains of his father with great ceremony in the imperial mausoleum, within the Church of the Holy Apostles in Constantinople.

 Europe 
 October – Siege of Paris: Count Odo slips through Viking-controlled territory, to ask the king of West Francia Charles the Fat for support. He returns with a relief force, and reaches safety within the walls. Charles arrives later with a large army, and establishes a camp at Montmartre. After negotiations he promises the Vikings tribute (Danegeld) worth 700 Livres (equivalent to 257kg of silver), and allows them to sail up the River Seine, to over-winter in Burgundy.

 Britain 
 King Alfred the Great of Wessex recaptures London from the Danish Vikings, and renames it Lundenburh. Slightly upstream from London Bridge, he builds a small harbor called Queenhithe. Alfred hands the town over to his son-in-law Æthelred, lord of Mercia. A street system is planned out in the town, with boundaries of 1,100 yards from east to west, and around 330 yards from north to south.

 King Alfred receives the formal submission of all of the citizens of England not under Viking rule, and adopts the title 'King of the Anglo-Saxons'.

 By topic 
 Religion 
 December – Emperor Leo VI dismisses Patriarch Photius I, who has been his tutor, and replaces him with his own brother Stephen I.
 The Glagolitic alphabet, devised by Cyril and Methodius, missionaries from Constantinople, is adopted in the Bulgarian Empire.
 Boris I, ruler (khan) of the Bulgarian Empire, establishes the Preslav and Ohrid Literary Schools.

Births 
 Ibn Muqlah, Muslim official and vizier (or 885)
 Ōnakatomi no Yorimoto, Japanese poet (approximate date)
 Yang Wo, emperor of Wu (Ten Kingdoms) (d. 908)

Deaths 
 March 9 – Abu Ma'shar al-Balkhi, Muslim scholar and astrologer (b. 787)
 August 29 – Basil I, emperor of the Byzantine Empire (b. 811)
 Adalbert I, Frankish margrave (approximate date)
 Airemón mac Áedo, king of Ulaid (Ireland)
 Bernard Plantapilosa, Frankish nobleman (b. 841)
 Deorlaf, bishop of Hereford (approximate date)
 Fiachnae mac Ainbítha, king of Ulaid 
 Gao Renhou, Chinese general
 Henry of Franconia, Frankish general
 Heongang, king of Silla (Korea)
 Hugh, archbishop of Cologne
 Joscelin, bishop of Paris
 Li Quanzhong, Chinese warlord
 Li Sigong, Chinese warlord (approximate date)
 Lu Yanhong, Chinese warlord
 Min Xu, governor of the Tang Dynasty
 Muhammad I, Muslim emir of Córdoba (b. 823)
 Robert I, Frankish nobleman
 Wang Xu, Chinese warlord
 Wulgrin I, Frankish nobleman
 Zhuge Shuang, Chinese general

References